Local elections were held in  Meycauayan City, Bulacan on May 9, 2016, within the Philippine general election. The voters will elect for the elective local posts in the city: the mayor, vice mayor, and ten councilors.

Mayoral and vice mayoral election
Due to term limitation, Incumbent City Mayor Joan Alarilla is taking her luck to be the next House Representative of 4th District of Bulacan. She will facing the incumbent 4th District House Representative Linabelle Villarica.

While in Meycauayan City, the daughter of Joan Alarilla, Judy Alarilla is running for City mayor under the Nationalist Peoples Coalition and her opponent, the Husband of House Representative Linabelle Villarica, Attorney Henry Villarica whose running for Liberal Party. The other candidate is Pabling Milan, an independent candidate.

Results
The candidates for mayor and vice mayor with the highest number of votes wins the seat; they are voted separately, therefore, they may be of different parties when elected.

Mayoral & Vice Mayoral Candidates
List of Candidates as of March 2016

City Council election
Election is via plurality-at-large voting: A voter votes for up to ten candidates, then the ten candidates with the highest number of votes are elected.

Team Villarica

|-bgcolor=black
|colspan=15|

2016 Philippine local elections
Meycauayan
Elections in Meycauayan